Crystal Lake State Park is a day-use state park and historic site in Barton, Vermont, United States. It is located at 96 Bellwater Avenue, off Willoughby Lake Road (Vermont Route 16) just east of the village, at the northwestern end of  Crystal Lake.  It features a sandy beach with swimming area, and a bath house built by the Civilian Conservation Corps (CCC).  A cottage is available for rental.   The park was added to the U.S. National Register of Historic Places on August 30, 2005, for its association with the CCC.

Features
Crystal Lake State Park is located at the northern end of Crystal Lake, a more than  body of water in southeastern Barton.  The park is located just southeast of the village center, and is accessed via Bellwater Avenue off Vermont Route 16.  The park has a wider area at its western end, where the entrance gate and parking area are located.  Also in this area are a ranger's house and a small waterfront cottage, which is available for rental when the park is open.  The parking lot is separated from the beach area to the south by a low stone wall built out of locally quarried granite.  This wall gradually tapers off to the east.  The eastern section of the park is narrow, with a strip of beach rising to a narrow grassy area.  At the back of the grassy area near the parking lot is the bathhouse. The bathhouse has restrooms, changing areas, and a concession stand. Other features are about 40 grills, almost 80 picnic tables, play areas, and boat rentals.

Activities include swimming, boating, fishing, wildlife watching and winter sports. There is hiking in nearby Willoughby State Forest. Crystal Lake Cottage accommodates up to 6 people.

History
The park was developed in the 1930s, mainly through the efforts of crews of the Civilian Conservation Corps.  They laid out the park, and built its parking lot, retaining wall, and most of the bathhouse.  The bathhouse was designed in David Fried, an architect based in New Hampshire who also created designs for other CCC-built facilities in Vermont.  It, like the retaining wall, was built out of locally quarried stone, and is unusual among the state's CCC-built facilities for its partly Modern design, which is tempered by the use of rusticated stone.  The building was completed in 1942 with local workers, because the CCC crews had been disbanded for service related to World War II.

The ranger's house and rental cottage were both purchased as additions to the park in the 1990s, and the gate house was built in 2003.

See also

National Register of Historic Places listings in Orleans County, Vermont

References

External links
 Crystal Lake State Park

State parks of Vermont
Protected areas of Orleans County, Vermont
Barton, Vermont
Parks on the National Register of Historic Places in Vermont
National Register of Historic Places in Orleans County, Vermont
1942 establishments in Vermont